Taomiao is a town of Jieshou City in northwestern Anhui province, China, located  from the border with Henan and  south of downtown Jieshou. , it has 14 villages under its administration.

See also 
 List of township-level divisions of Anhui

References 

Towns in Anhui